Vivion is a given name. Notable people with the name include:

Vivion Brewer (1900–1991), American desegregationist
Vivion de Valera (1910–1982), Irish politician, businessman, and lawyer

See also
Vivian (name)
Vivion group